Tracy Wilson (born February 27, 1989) is an American football safety who is currently a free agent. He was signed by the New York Jets as an undrafted free agent in 2011. He attended St. Francis de Sales High School in Chicago, Illinois where he graduated in 2006. He played college football at Northern Illinois.

Professional career

New York Jets
Wilson was made eligible for the Supplemental Draft but he went undrafted. He was signed by the New York Jets on August 24, 2011. Wilson was released on September 3 as part of the final roster cuts prior to the beginning of the season. He was signed to the team's practice squad on October 12. He was promoted to the active roster on November 29. Wilson made his NFL debut on December 4 against the Washington Redskins.

Wilson was waived by the team on August 1, 2012.

Tennessee Titans
On August 8, 2012, Wilson signed with the Tennessee Titans. On October 31, 2012, Wilson was waived by the Tennessee Titans

On November 3, 2012, he was re-signed by the Titans. On August 26, 2013, he was waived by the Titans.

Columbus Lions
In 2016, Wilson signed with the Columbus Lions.

References

External links
Tennessee Titans bio
New York Jets bio
NIU Huskies bio

1989 births
Living people
People from Harvey, Illinois
Players of American football from Illinois
American football safeties
Northern Illinois Huskies football players
New York Jets players
Tennessee Titans players
Columbus Lions players